Robert Michael Thompson (18 November 1911 – 16 April 1988) was a stand-up comedian, actor and entertainer from Penshaw, Sunderland. Although he was raised in Penshaw, he also lived in Great Lumley and Barley Mow, near Chester-le-Street, later moving to Whitley Bay.

Early years
He was the seventh child of John and Mary Thompson, both of whom died by the time Bobby was eight years old. He was then raised by his elder sister in the village of Fatfield.

After leaving school at fifteen, he started work at North Biddick Colliery, earning seven shillings and sixpence a week. He would supplement his income by playing the harmonica around local public houses and competing in Domino tournaments. His first stand-up performance took place at the Gem Cinema in Penshaw as a young boy.

Thompson was married three times. His first wife was Anna Marjoram . His second wife, Phyllis, died on 25 April 1967. He announced his engagement to Mary Douglass, 62, of Annfield Plain a few years later, but the engagement was called off. In 1982, Thompson married his housekeeper, Eleanor Cicely Palmer, more commonly known as Cissy Ward (née Wake). Thompson was her third husband and she was famous for being taller than him.

Career
Famous for his broad Pitmatic (County Durham pit village) accent (often mistaken for Geordie), self-deprecating humour and mastery of the Mother in Law joke, Thompson was affectionately known as The Little Waster due to his short stature, which he often played on during his act. His most famous outfit was a worn out stripey jumper (Wooly gansey) and flat cap. His ever-present Woodbine (Cigarette) stub, hanging from the corner of his mouth, was also an integral part of his on-stage persona.

His attempts to move beyond North East England were limited.  and the regional bias of his humour, although he did enjoy some success with the BBC show, Wot Cheor Geordie. He did appear on the Wogan show in 1985.

Bobby made recordings of three comedy songs written for him by local composer Eric Boswell: You Little Waster. The songs incorporated jokes from Bobby's act.

Personal problems and his health affected his career in the 1970s, but he remained a North East favourite, particularly on the club scene, until his death.

Death 
Thompson died on 16 April 1988, after suffering from emphysema and cancer.

References

External links
North East Comedian Bobby Thompson

1911 births
1988 deaths
English male comedians
People from Sunderland
Comedians from Tyne and Wear
Male actors from Tyne and Wear
Actors from County Durham
20th-century comedians
People from Fatfield